Events in the year 2023 in India.

Incumbents

National government

State governments

Events

January
 1 January
 Anjali Singh is killed while riding her scooter in Delhi
 Kashmir conflict: Four civilians are killed and six others injured when two gunmen open fire against Hindu people's homes in Rajouri district, Jammu and Kashmir.
 2 January 
 Protests are reported in some parts of Jammu and Kashmir in response to the previous day's quadruple killing.
 The Supreme Court of India upholds the legality of the government's decision to demonetise all ₹500 and ₹1,000 banknotes of the Mahatma Gandhi Series in 2016.
 Rajouri attacks – Two children are killed and four other people are injured by an explosion outside the home of one of the four Hindus who were killed.
4 January – The Competition Commission of India rejects an appeal from Google over its ruling in October that Google's dominant position in the search engine market and control of the Android app store violated India's antitrust laws.
13–29 January - 2023 Men's FIH Hockey World Cup

February 

 26  February - Manish Sisodia, Deputy Chief Minister of Delhi arrested by Central Bureau of Investigation in liquor policy case
 28 February - Manish Sisodia and Satyendra Jain resign from their posts as ministers following the arrests.

Predicted and scheduled events
February to December – 2023 elections in India
October to November - 2023 Cricket World Cup to be held in India.
India is projected to surpass China to become the world's most populous country.

Deaths

January 
1 January
N. C. Debbarma, 80, politician, Tripura MLA (since 2018)
R. K. Krishna Kumar, 84, entrepreneur (Tata Sons, Sir Dorabji Tata and Allied Trusts)
2 January – Siddeshwar Swami, 82, Hindu religious leader
3 January
Laxman Pandurang Jagtap, 59, politician, Maharashtra MLA (since 2009)
4 January
Thirumagan Evera, 46, politician, Tamil Nadu MLA (since 2021)
Beeyar Prasad, 61, lyricist (Kilichundan Mampazham, Njan Salperu Ramankutty, Vamanapuram Bus Route)
7 January
Nazrul Islam, 73, politician, Assam MLA (1996–2021)
Tehemton Erach Udwadia, 88, surgeon and gastroenterologist
8 January – Keshari Nath Tripathi, 88, politician, Uttar Pradesh MLA (1977–1980, 1989–2007), governor of West Bengal (2014–2019) and twice of Bihar.
9 January – Rehman Rahi, 97, poet.
 12 January – Sharad Yadav, 75, politician from Rashtriya Janata Dal (RJD) party.
 14 January – Mansa Ram, 82, politician, Himachal Pradesh MLA (1967–1977, 1982–1985, 1998–2003).
 18 January
Jagdish Nehra, 79, politician, Haryana MLA (1982–1987).
Prabhaben Shah, 92, social worker.
 19 January
Abdul Ghani Azhari, 101, Islamic scholar.
Kuldip Singh Dhillon, 72, Indian-British property developer and polo player.
Nilmani Phookan Jr, 89, poet.
 21 January – Harjit Singh Arora, 61, Indian Air Force officer, vice chief of the air staff (2019–2021).
 23 January – E. Ramdoss, 66, film director, screenwriter (Aayiram Pookkal Malarattum, Ravanan) and actor.
 24 January – B. V. Doshi, 95, architect (CEPT University, Tagore Memorial Hall, Indian Institute of Management Bangalore), Pritzker Prize winner (2018).
 25 January – Shantabai Kamble, 99, writer.
 26 January – Judo. K. K. Rathnam, 92, stuntman (Thamarai Kulam, Vallavan Oruvan, Thalai Nagaram).
 27 January – Jamuna, 86, actress (Milan, Pandanti Kapuram) and politician, MP (1989–1991).
 29 January 
Naba Das, 61, politician, Odisha MLA (since 2009).
Mandeep Roy, 73, actor (Minchina Ota, Baadada Hoo, Benkiya Bale), cardiac arrest.
Vatti Vasant Kumar, 67, politician, Andhra Pradesh MLA (2004–2014).
 30 January – K. V. Tirumalesh, 82, writer and poet.
 31 January – Shanti Bhushan, 97, Indian lawyer and politician, minister of law and justice (1977–1979).

February 
 2 February – K. Viswanath, 92, actor and filmmaker.
 4 February – Vani Jairam, 77, playback singer.
 5 February – T. P. Gajendran, 68, actor, comedian and director.
 19 February – Mayilsamy, 57, actor and comedian.

March 
 8 March – Satish Kaushik, 66, actor and filmmaker.

See also

Country overviews
 History of India
 History of modern India
 Outline of India
 Government of India
 Politics of India
 Timeline of Indian history
 Years in India

Related timelines for current period
 2020s in political history
 2020s
 21st century

References

 
India
India
2020s in India
Years of the 21st century in India